Pedro Gomes de Abreu (c.1390-1453) was a Portuguese nobleman, Lord of Regalados. and Alcaide mor de Lapela.

Biography 

Born in Portugal, was the son of Lopo Gomes de Abreu and Inês de Soutomaior e Lima, daughter of Leonel de Lima (Viscount of Vila Nova de Cerveira), and Filipa da Cunha. His Mistress was Catarina de Eça, daughter of Infante Fernando, Lord of Eça  and granddaughter of Peter I of Portugal.

References 

1390s births
1453 deaths
14th-century Portuguese people
15th-century Portuguese people
Portuguese nobility
Portuguese Roman Catholics